American decline is the idea that the United States of America is diminishing in power geopolitically, militarily, financially, economically, technologically, demographically, socially, morally, spiritually, culturally, in matters of healthcare, and/or on environmental issues. There has been debate over the extent of the decline, and whether it is relative or absolute. Those who believe America is in decline are declinists.

With the rise of China challenging to vie for global geopolitical dominance has constituted a core issue in the debate over American decline since the late 2010s. American global domination may be threatened by a rising and a more geopolitically assertive China potentially challenging America's prevailing role as the world's leading geopolitical superpower and seeking to overtake it in the international arena.. For instance, the United States is no longer the sole uncontested superpower in every region of the world. According to the 2021 Asia Power Index, within Asia, the United States still takes the lead on military capacity, cultural influence, resilience, future resources, diplomatic influence, and defense networks, but falls behind China in two parameters: economic capability and economic relationships.

Shrinking military advantages, deficit spending, geopolitical overreach, and a shift in moral, social, and behavioral conditions have been associated with American decline.

Some scholars say that the perception of decline, or declinism, has long been part of American culture. In a poll conducted January 11–13, 2021 of 1,019 Americans, 79% of those surveyed said that America is "falling apart".

Assessment
According to American public intellectual Noam Chomsky, America's decline started shortly after the end of World War II, with the "loss of China" followed by the Indochina Wars. By 1970, the United States' share of world wealth had declined to about 25%, which was still large but sharply reduced. Chomsky dismisses the "remarkable rhetoric of the several years of triumphalism in the 1990s" as "mostly self-delusion". However, Chomsky argued in 2011 that power will not shift to China and India, because these are poor countries with severe internal problems, and there will be no competitor for global hegemonic power in the foreseeable future.

According to Jeet Heer, U.S. hegemony has always been supported by three pillars: "economic strength, military might, and the soft power of cultural dominance." According to American diplomat Eric S. Edelman, the declinists, or those who believe America is in decline, have been "consistently wrong" in the past. However, American political scientist Aaron Friedberg cautioned that just because the declinists were wrong in the past does not mean they will be incorrect in their future predictions, and that some of the arguments by the declinists deserve to be taken seriously.

Political scientist Matthew Kroenig argues Washington has "followed the same basic, three-step geopolitical plan since 1945. First, the United States built the current, rules-based international system... Second, it welcomed into the club any country that played by the rules, even former adversaries... and third, the U.S. worked with its allies to defend the system from those countries or groups that would challenge it."

Military
According to a 98-page report by National Defense Strategy Commission, "America's longstanding military advantages have diminished", and "The country's strategic margin for error has become distressingly small. Doubts about America's ability to deter and, if necessary, defeat opponents and honor its global commitments have proliferated." The report cited "political dysfunction" and "budget caps" as factors restraining the government from keeping pace with threats in what the report described as "a crisis of national security." The report wrote that, to neutralize American strength, China and Russia were trying to achieve "regional hegemony" and were developing "aggressive military buildups". In 2018, Air Force General Frank Gorenc said that the United States airpower advantage over Russia and China was shrinking. According to Loren Thompson, the military's decline began when defense secretary Dick Cheney stopped a hundred major weapons programs 25 years ago when the Soviet Union collapsed.

Deficit spending 
Paul Kennedy posits that continued deficit spending, especially on military build-up, is the single most important reason for decline of any great power. The costs of the wars in Iraq and Afghanistan were as of 2017 estimated to run as high as $4.4 trillion, which Kennedy deems a major victory for Osama bin Laden, whose announced goal was to humiliate America by showcasing its casualty averseness and lack of will to persist in a long term conflict. By 2011, the U.S. military budget — almost matching that of the rest of the world combined — was higher in real terms than at any time since WWII.

Kennedy made similar assessments about American decline in his book The Rise and Fall of the Great Powers in which he projected "a need to 'manage' affairs so that the relative erosion of the United States' position takes place slowly and smoothly". The book was published in 1989, three years before the dissolution of the Soviet Union and several years before the bursting of the Japanese asset price bubble, leaving the United States as the sole remaining superpower and the dominant political and economic power internationally.

Geopolitical overreach 
According to historian Emmanuel Todd, an expansion in military activity and aggression can appear to be an increase in power, but can mask a decline in power. He observes that this occurred with the Soviet Union in the 1970s, and with the Roman Empire, and that the United States may be going through a similar period in time. 

There were 38 large and medium-sized American facilities spread around the globe in 2005—mostly air and naval bases—approximately the same number as Britain's 36 naval bases and army garrisons at its imperial zenith in 1898. Yale historian Paul Kennedy compares the U.S. situation to Great Britain's prior to World War I, saying that the map of U.S. bases is similar.

Culture
Commentators such as Allan Bloom, E. D. Hirsch and Russel Jacoby have suggested American culture is in decline. Samuel P. Huntington commented critically on a trend in American culture and politics of predicting constant decline since the late 1950s. As he saw it, declinism came in several distinct waves, namely in reaction to the Soviet Union's launch of Sputnik; to the Vietnam War; to the oil shock of 1973; to Soviet tensions in the late 1970s; and to the general unease that accompanied the end of the Cold War. According to American historian Russell Jacoby, the rise of academic Marxism, radical political economies, and critical literary and cultural studies since the World War II has contributed to the decline of American culture.

William J. Bennett argued that America's cultural decline is signaling "a shift in the public's attitudes and beliefs". According to the Index of Leading Cultural Indicators, published in 1993, statistically portraying the moral, social and behavioral conditions of modern American society, often described as 'values', America's cultural condition was in decline with respect to the situations of 30 years ago, 1963. The index showed that there has been an increase in violent crime by more than 6 times, illegitimate births by more than 5 times, the divorce rate by 5 times, the percentage of children living in single-parent homes by four times, and the teenage suicide rate by three times during the 30-year period. However, by 2011, Bennett and others had acknowledged that there was a marked reduction in the violent crime rate, a reduction of suicide and divorce, as well as improvements in many other social metrics, since 1993. Bennett wrote that contemporary authors see these improving metrics as evidence that the social decline from the 1960s to the early 1990s was temporary, while others (including Bennett) remain sceptical.

According to Kenneth Weisbrode, though some statistics point to American decline (increased death rate, political paralysis, and increased crime), "Americans have had a low culture for a very long time, and have long promoted it". He thinks that the obsession with decline is not something new, as something dating back to the Puritans. "Cultural decline, in other words, is as American as apple pie," Weisbrode argues. Weisbrode likens pre-revolutionary France and present-day America for their vulgarity, which he argues is "an almost natural extension or outcome of all that is civilized: a glorification of ego."

Daniel Bell argued that the perception of decline is part of the culture. "What the long history of American 'declinism' -- as opposed to America's actual possible decline -- suggests," says Daniel Bell, "is that these anxieties have an existence of their own that is quite distinct from the actual geopolitical position of our country; that they arise as much from something deeply rooted in the collective psyche of our chattering classes as from sober political and economic analyses."

According to RealClearPolitics, declarations of America's declining power have been common since the beginning of the country. According to Australian journalist Nick Bryant, "warnings of American decline are by no means new". In the 20th century, declinism came in several distinct waves. In a 2011 book, Thomas L. Friedman and Michael Mandelbaum argued that the United States was in the midst of "its fifth wave of Declinism." The first had come "with the 'Sputnik Shock' of 1957," the second with the Vietnam War, the third with President Jimmy Carter's "malaise" and the rise of Japan, the fourth with the increased power of China. According to Robert Lieber in 2021, “declinists’ proclamations about America have appeared ever since America’s founding" and “it can be instructive to compare current arguments and prescriptions of the new declinism with the ideas of earlier eras.”

Political polarization 
Many commentators and polls have observed an increase in political polarization in the US.

Some researchers have linked trends towards political polarization in the United States and other countries to increased economic inequality and economic decline. David Leonhardt writes that "incomes, wealth and life expectancy in the United States have stagnated for much of the population, contributing to an angry national mood and exacerbating political divisions. The result is a semidysfunctional government that is eroding many of the country’s largest advantages over China."

According to a report by Oxford researchers including sociologist Philip N. Howard, social media played a major role in political polarization in the United States, due to computational propaganda -- "the use of automation, algorithms, and big-data analytics to manipulate public life"—such as the spread of fake news and conspiracy theories. The researchers highlighted the role of the Russian Internet Research Agency in attempts to undermine democracy in the US and exacerbate existing political divisions. The most prominent methods of misinformation were ostensibly organic posts rather than ads, and influence operation activity increased after, and was not limited to, the 2016 election. Sarah Kreps of Brookings points out that in the wake of foreign influence operations which are nothing new but boosted by digital tools, the U.S. has had to spend exorbitantly on defensive measures "just to break even on democratic legitimacy."

Michael McFaul, former U.S. Ambassador to Russia from 2012 to 2014, believes the U.S. has faced a democratic decline, stemming from elite polarization and damage done by former President Donald Trump to trust in elections and bonds with democratic allies. McFaul states that the decline in democracy weakens national security and heavily restrains foreign policy.

According to 2021 survey data compiled from YouGov, Nationscape, and the Voter Study Group, 36% of Republican and 33% of Democrat respondents say that they "feel justified to use violence to advance political goals". This represents a sharp increase from 2017, in which only 8% of Republican and 8% of Democrat respondents said the same. Similarly, a survey performed by the University of Virginia Center for Politics found that more than 80% of both Democrats and Republicans believe that the opposing party poses "a clear and present danger to American democracy". Overall, more than 80% of survey respondents said they are afraid that they or someone close to them will experience "personal loss or suffering due to the effects" of the opposing party's policies.

Economy

By 1970 U.S. share of world production had fallen from 40% to 25%, while economist Jeffrey Sachs observed the US share of world income was 24.6% in 1980 falling to 19.1% in 2011. The ratio of average CEO earnings to average workers’ pay in the U.S. went from 24:1 in 1965 to 262:1 in 2005. In 2018, income inequality reached the highest level recorded by the Census Bureau.

In the 1980s the United States went from the world's largest creditor nation to becoming the world's largest debtor nation. At the start of the decade U.S. net foreign assets were larger than combined net foreign assets of all other creditors. At the end foreign-owned U.S. securities and real assets were larger than U.S. owned foreign securities and assets. In the interval it was advantageous for foreign investors to purchase U.S. dollar securities and real assets to absorb their excess capital. In effect, significant foreign investment began to influence the American economy.

Some centrists believe that the American fiscal crisis stems from the rising expenditures on social programs or alternatively from the increases in military spending for the Iraq and Afghanistan wars, both of which would lead to decline. However, Richard Lachmann argues that if military or overall spending is not pressuring the U.S. economy, they would not contribute to U.S. decline. Lachmann describes the real problem as "the misallocation of government revenue and expenditure, resulting in resources being diverted from the tasks vital to maintain economic or geopolitical dominance." Kennedy argues that as military expenses grow, this reduces investments in economic growth, which eventually "leads to the downward spiral of slower growth, heavier taxes, deepening domestic splits over spending priorities, and weakening capacity to bear the burdens of defense."

Health 
Various analysts have connected health challenges in the United States, such as rising healthcare costs, to overall national decline. A 2018 paper in the American Journal of Public Health reviewed multiple factors that were observed by previous researchers such as rising health care costs, decreased life expectancy, and an increase in "deaths of despair" such as suicides and opioid overdoses, and connected this to "the long-term malaise seen in the United States". The rate of maternal mortality has more than doubled in the U.S. since the late 1980s in stark contrast to other developed nations. The economists Anne Case and Angus Deaton attribute this rising mortality, which is mostly impacting the working class, to the flaws in contemporary capitalism.

According to the Social Progress Index, the US is facing "small but steady declines" in health and other matters and along with Brazil and Hungary was one of few nations to slide backwards on the index between 2010 and 2020. Concerning the index, Nicholas Kristof said this points to structural problems that predate Trump, Trump being "a symptom of this malaise, and also a cause of its acceleration".

Many scientific experts and former government officials have criticized Donald Trump and his administration's role in the COVID-19 pandemic response, such as interfering with science agencies and perpetrating falsehoods during the COVID-19 pandemic. In Nature, Jeff Tollefson warned that Trump's damage to science could take decades to recover from, and some of this damage could be permanent. In October 2020, Pew Research found that Trump's handling of the coronavirus pandemic eroded America's already declining global reputation.

According to data from the CDC, the average US life expectancy, after falling to 77 years in 2020, in 2021 further declined to 76.4 years, a record-low since 1996. COVID-19 deaths were the main cause of this decline, as well as rising mortality rates from suicide, liver disease and drug overdoses.

Competition with China

Factors and debates 

China challenging the United States for global dominance constitutes a core issue in the debate over the American decline. The United States is no longer the only uncontested superpower to dominate in every domain (i.e. military, culture, economy, technology, diplomatic) in every region of the world. According to the 2021 Asia Power Index, within Asia, the United States still takes the lead on military capacity, cultural influence, resilience, future resources, diplomatic influence, and defense networks, but falls behind China in two parameters: economic capability and economic relationships.

In 2020, China signed the Regional Comprehensive Economic Partnership, the world's largest free trade bloc. Time magazine argued the US could be "the big loser" of the deal. However, The Wall Street Journal reported that the tariff-related liberalizations from RCEP would be modest, calling it a "paper tiger". A comprehensive study into the deal shows that it would add just 0.08% to China's 2030 GDP without India's participation.

China surpassed the US in trade in goods with the European Union for the first time in 2020 while the US remained the European Union’s largest trading partner overall. In December, the EU announced the Comprehensive Agreement on Investment with China was concluded in principle. Some analysts said the agreement may damage relations with the US. In March 2021, it was reported that there were serious doubts about the ratification of the deal in light of the reciprocal sanctions the EU and China imposed against each other over the ongoing human rights violations committed by the Chinese government against the Uyghurs and other ethnic and religious minorities in Xinjiang.

In 2020, China surpassed the US for a second time as the world's leading nation for foreign direct investment (FDI). Daniel Rosen, a long-time analyst of U.S.-China economic relationship, said that it is natural that foreign investment would decline sharply in the U.S. under extraordinary circumstances due to its open market economy, a feature that China lacks. Rosen said, "There is no reason to be concerned about the outlook for the FDI in the United States providing that the U.S. is sticking with its basic open-market competitive system." Previously, in 2003, China surpassed the US once as the biggest recipient of FDI.

Political scientist Matthew Kroenig states "according to an emerging conventional wisdom, China has the leg up on the U.S. in part because its authoritarian government can strategically plan for the long term, unencumbered by competing branches of government, regular elections, and public opinion. Yet this faith in autocratic ascendance and democratic decline is contrary to historical fact." Kroenig's makes the argument that open societies "facilitate innovation, trust in financial markets, and economic growth." Kroenig also suggests "the plans often cited as evidence of China’s farsighted vision, the Belt and Road Initiative and Made in China 2025, were announced by Xi only in 2013 and 2015, respectively. Both are way too recent to be celebrated as brilliant examples of successful, long-term strategic planning."

According to David Leonhardt, "Beyond the economy, China has also made stark progress in other areas over the past decade. It is close to becoming the world’s leading funder of scientific research and development, thanks to soaring increases in China and meager ones in the United States. The quality of American science remains higher, but the gap has narrowed." Naughton questioned whether it is economically sensible for a middle income country of this kind to be taking "such a disproportionate part of the risky expenditure involved in pioneering new technologies".

According to former Australian prime minister Kevin Rudd, "China has multiple domestic vulnerabilities that are rarely noted in the media. The United States, on the other hand, always has its weaknesses on full public display, but has repeatedly demonstrated its capacity for reinvention and restoration." Ryan Hass, a senior fellow in foreign policy at the Brookings Institution, said that much of the narrative of China "inexorably rising and on the verge of overtaking a faltering United States" was promoted by China's state-affiliated media outlets. Hass went on to say, "Authoritarian systems excel at showcasing their strengths and concealing their weaknesses. But policymakers in Washington must be able to distinguish between the image Beijing presents and the realities it confronts."

According to American economist Scott Rozelle and researcher Natalie Hell, "China looks a lot more like 1980s Mexico or Turkey than 1980s Taiwan or South Korea. No country has ever made it to high-income status with high school attainment rates below 50 percent. With China's high school attainment rate of 30 percent, the country could be in grave trouble." At age 30, the number of years of schooling in China is 34.6 percent less than in the United States. At age 40, the gap widens to 38.9 percent. At age 50, it further widens to 47 percent. At age 60, it becomes 55.5 percent. Rozelle and Hell warn that China risks falling into the middle income trap due to the rural urban divide in education and structural unemployment.

Ryan Hass at the Brookings Institution said that China's working-age population is already shrinking, adding, "by 2050, China will go from having eight workers per retiree now to two workers per retiree. Moreover, it has already squeezed out most of the large productivity gains that come with a population becoming more educated and urban and adopting technologies to make manufacturing more efficient." Nicholas Eberstadt, an economist and demographic expert at the American Enterprise Institute, said that current demographic trends will overwhelm China's economy and geopolitics, making its rise much more uncertain. He said, "The age of heroic economic growth is over."

Foreign policy
In May 2020, in accordance with the John S. McCain National Defense Authorization Act for Fiscal Year 2019, the Trump administration delivered a report, "U.S. Strategic Approach to the People's Republic of China" to members of the U.S. Congress. The report states a whole-of-government approach to China under the 2017 National Security Strategy, which says it is time the U.S. "rethink the failed policies of the past two decades – policies based on the assumption that engagement with rivals and their inclusion in international institutions and global commerce would turn them into benign actors and trustworthy partners". The report says it "reflects a fundamental reevaluation of how the United States understands and responds to" the leaders of China, adding "The United States recognizes the long-term strategic competition between our two systems."

In February 2021, President Joe Biden said that China is the "most serious competitor" that poses challenges on the "prosperity, security, and democratic values" of the U.S. Secretary of State Antony Blinken stated that previous optimistic approaches to China were flawed, and that China poses "the most significant challenge of any nation-state in the world to the United States". Blinken also agreed that Biden's predecessor, Donald Trump, "was right in taking a tougher approach to China". In April 2021, the U.S. Senate introduced major legislation in response to China's growing clout in international affairs. The bill, titled "Strategic Competition Act of 2021", reflects hardline attitude of both congressional Democrats and Republicans, and sets out to counter the Chinese government's diplomatic and strategic initiatives.

In May 2021, the Strategic Competition Act of 2021 was consolidated into a larger bill, the United States Innovation and Competition Act (USICA), authorizing  for basic and advanced technology research over a five year period. In June 2021, the USICA passed 68–32 in the Senate with bipartisan support.

Comparison with earlier states

Samuel P. Huntington noticed that predictions of American decline have been part of American politics since the late 1950s. According to Daniel Bell, "many of America's leading commentators have had a powerful impulse consistently to see the United States as a weak, 'bred out' basket case that will fall to stronger rivals as inevitably as Rome fell to the barbarians, or France to Henry V at Agincourt." Huntington critiqued declinism as misguided, but praised it on some counts, "declinism has predicted the imminent shrinkage of American power. In all its phases that prediction has become central to preventing that shrinkage".

Michael Hudson points to debt forgiveness being necessary when individuals' debts to the state are too large. Whereas earlier empires (Assyrian) survived through periodic debt forgiveness, this practice ended with the Roman empire, resulting in impoverishment and dispossession of farmers, creating a growing lumpenproletariat. The same process contributed to the collapse of the British empire and continues today, with periodic financial crises (1930s, 2008) which are only relieved by government bailouts and/or war. Hudson adds that every time history repeats itself, the price goes up, i.e., the U.S. is being destroyed by bank debt with no forgiveness mechanism, making collapse inevitable.

Political scientist Paul K. Macdonald writes that great powers can be in relative or absolute decline and discussed the ways they often respond. The most common is retrenchment (reducing some but not all commitments of the state).

Roman Empire
Certain commentators, historians and politicians believe U.S. is heir to the Roman Empire. According to Kristofer Allerfeldt, there are divergent views regarding Rome vs U.S. comparison. He believes that the "use of the Roman metaphor provides a scholarly patina to the expression of visceral hopes and fears."

Britain
Kennedy argues that "British financial strength was the single most decisive factor in its victories over France during the 18th century. This chapter ends on the Napoleonic Wars and the fusion of British financial strength with a newfound industrial strength." He predicts that, as the U.S. dollar loses its role as world currency, it will not be able to continue financing its military expenditures via deficit spending.

According to Richard Lachmann, the U.S. would last much longer if, like Britain, it could restrict particular families and elites from exclusively controlling offices and governmental powers.

Comparison with newer states

Soviet Union 
Historian Harold James published an article in 2020 titled "Late Soviet America", comparing the present-day United States to the former Soviet Union. James wrote that many aspects of the US now resemble the late Soviet Union: intensification of social conflict, ethnic/racial rivalries, and economic decline. He predicted that the dollar may lose its value and start looking like the Soviet rouble. James ended the article saying that the economic decline will continue, even if there is change in leadership, pointing to Mikhail Gorbachev's inability to prevent collapse after succeeding Leonid Brezhnev.

Also in 2020, political commentator Julius Krein argued that the ongoing America's state of decline parallels the late Soviet Union vis-à-vis the "unmistakable" slide into gerontocracy.

Alex Lo, a columnist from South China Morning Post, wrote in 2021 that "Soviet Russia under Mikhail Gorbachev didn't know they had already lost the empire until it was too late. The fate of the United States will not be any different."

Commentators
 Philosophers Michael Hardt and Antonio Negri, theorize in the mid-1990s about an ongoing transition to an emergent construct created among ruling powers which the authors call "Empire".
 American historian Morris Berman wrote a trilogy of books published between 2000 and 2011 about the decline of American civilization.
 Igor Panarin, a political scientist and graduate of the Higher Military Command School of Telecommunications of the KGB, predicted that, starting in 1998, the US would collapse into six parts in 2010. He also wrote The Crash of the Dollar and the Disintegration of the USA (2009). 
 Russian political analyst Stanislav Belkovsky predicted that it might be America's turn to plunge into self-destructive violence and inevitable collapse.
 American journalist Chris Hedges, in his 2018 book America The Farewell Tour, predicts that "within a decade, two at most" America will cease to be the dominant super-power in the world.
 In 2017, Evan Osnos of The New Yorker outlined a potential scenario for a violent revolution in the US and the consequences for the “super-rich.” 
 Donald Trump was the first presidential candidate to promote the idea that the United States was in decline.
After the January 6 United States Capitol riots, HuffPost reporter Emily Peck wrote an article titled "The Capitol Riot Crystalizes 4 Years Of American Decline".
 Jean Chrétien, former prime minister of Canada (1993–2003), described Trump's election as a "monumental error" that heralded "the true end of the American empire" in a 2018 memoir.
The American think tank Atlantic Council argues that while the US is indeed declining, thinking it is irreversible is "irrational pessimism".
According to The Intercept, adoption of neutral path by Asian, African, and Latin American countries amid the Ukraine invasion could signal "a clean break from the past several centuries of Western hegemony, not just in politics but in culture and ideas as well."

Public opinion
2018 polls placed the U.S. leadership a notch below China's 31% and left Germany as the most popular power with an approval of 41%.

A 2019 survey carried out by Pew Research Center shows that a majority of Americans predicted the U.S. economy to be weaker in 2050. Also, the survey says, a majority of the people thought the U.S. would be "a country with a burgeoning national debt, a wider gap between the rich and the poor and a workforce threatened by automation."

In the midst of the COVID-19 pandemic, public opinion of both the United States and China worsened in most countries surveyed by Pew Research. The opinion of the US was more favorable than that of China overall; opinion of the handling of the pandemic was negative in both countries, but the opinion of China's handling of the pandemic was more favorable than the US.

According to a January 2021 survey of 1,032 people from ASEAN countries by Singapore's ISEAS–Yusof Ishak Institute, 61.5% of the respondents said they would choose the U.S. over China if they had to pick sides in the ongoing rivalry between the two countries. Support for the U.S. rose 7.9% from the previous year's survey.

In a 2021 poll of 1,019 Americans just after the riot at the Capitol, 79% of those surveyed said that America is "falling apart". At the same time, a similar proportion of survey respondents indicated that they are "proud to be an American".

In late January 2021, Pew reported that as Biden's inauguration approached, polls showed the international opinion of the United States in Europe improved significantly, raising to 72–84% optimism about US relations in Britain, France, and Germany.

A January 2022 poll conducted by NPR/Ipsos found that over 70% of U.S. respondents believe democracy is "in crisis and at risk of failing."

See also
 After the Empire by Emmanuel Todd
 American Century
 American Empire Project
 American imperialism
 Decadence
 The Decline of the West by Oswald Spengler
 Dumbing down
 Idiocracy, a 2006 science fiction comedy film
 Managed decline
 Pax Americana
 Rust Belt
 Second American Civil War
 Sick man of Europe
 Societal collapse
 State collapse
 Superpower collapse
 Financial crisis of 2007–2008
 The Decline (EP), a 1999 punk rock song

References

Further reading

Declinism
Economic history of the United States
Geopolitics
History of the United States
Political debates
Social philosophy
Societal collapse
Superpowers